Shumikhinsky District is an administrative and municipal district (raion), one of the twenty-four in Kurgan Oblast, Russia. It is located in the west of the oblast. Its administrative center is the town of Shumikha. Population:  33,051 (2002 Census);  The population of Shumikha accounts for 62.5% of the district's total population.

References

Notes

Sources

Districts of Kurgan Oblast